Pierre Capdevielle may refer to:

 Pierre Capdevielle (musician) (1906–1969), French conductor, composer, and music critic
 Pierre Capdevielle (rugby union) (born 1974), French rugby union footballer

See also 
 Pierre Capdeville (1908–1980), French entomologist